William Talbot may refer to:

Sir William Talbot (died 1396), MP for Cornwall in 1380 and 1385
Sir William Talbot (died 1429), MP for Cornwall in 1402 and 1414
Sir William Talbot, 1st Baronet (died 1633), Irish lawyer and politician
Sir William Talbot, 3rd Baronet (c. 1643–1691), Irish politician and judge
William Talbot (Jacobite) (died 1689), Irish Jacobite soldier
William Talbot (died 1724), Irish Jacobite politician 
William Talbot (bishop) (1658–1730), Bishop of Oxford, Salisbury and Bishop of Durham
William Talbot, 1st Earl Talbot (1710–1782), British nobleman and politician
William Talbot (1715–1787), Irish MP for St Johnstown
William Talbot (1717–1774), "Talbot of Kineton", evangelical clergyman of the Church of England and grandson of the bishop
Talbot v. Janson, the Supreme Court case involving an American named William Talbot
William Talbot (1776–1851), Irish MP for Kilkenny
William Talbot (Newfoundland politician) (died 1873), former member of the Newfoundland House of Assembly
William Fox Talbot (1800–1877), inventor of the negative / positive photographic process
William F. Talbot (died 1967), first director of SRI International
William Phillips Talbot (1915–2010), American diplomat
Billy Talbot (born 1943), American singer-songwriter